Nenad Grozdić (born 3 February 1974) is a Serbian football manager and former professional footballer who played as a midfielder.

After making a name for himself at Obilić, Grozdić went on to play for Vitesse and Lens, among others. He also represented FR Yugoslavia internationally, earning 11 caps between 1998 and 2000.

Honours
Obilić
 First League of FR Yugoslavia: 1997–98

References

External links
 Vitesse profile
 
 
 
 

Association football midfielders
2. Liga (Austria) players
Bursaspor footballers
Eredivisie players
Expatriate footballers in Austria
Expatriate footballers in France
Expatriate footballers in Spain
Expatriate footballers in the Netherlands
Expatriate footballers in Turkey
FC Juniors OÖ players
First League of Serbia and Montenegro players
FK Majdanpek players
FK Obilić players
FK Rad players
FK Rudar Kostolac players
FK Timok managers
Ligue 1 players
People from Kučevo
Racing de Ferrol footballers
RC Lens players
SBV Vitesse players
Segunda División players
Serbia and Montenegro expatriate footballers
Serbia and Montenegro expatriate sportspeople in Austria
Serbia and Montenegro expatriate sportspeople in France
Serbia and Montenegro expatriate sportspeople in Spain
Serbia and Montenegro expatriate sportspeople in the Netherlands
Serbia and Montenegro expatriate sportspeople in Turkey
Serbia and Montenegro footballers
Serbia and Montenegro international footballers
Serbian expatriate footballers
Serbian expatriate sportspeople in Austria
Serbian football managers
Serbian footballers
Süper Lig players
TFF First League players
1974 births
Living people